Scinax ictericus is a species of frog in the family Hylidae.
It is found in Colombia, Peru, possibly Bolivia, and possibly Brazil.
Its natural habitats are subtropical or tropical moist lowland forests and intermittent freshwater marshes.
It is threatened by habitat loss.

References

ictericus
Amphibians of Colombia
Amphibians of Peru
Amphibians described in 1993
Taxonomy articles created by Polbot